This is a list of member stations of the Public Broadcasting Service, a network of non-commercial educational television stations in the United States. The list is arranged alphabetically by state and based on the station's city of license and followed in parentheses by the designated market area when different from the city of license. There are links to and articles on each of the stations, describing their local programming and technical information, such as broadcast frequencies. The station's advertised channel number follows the call letters.  In most cases, this is their virtual channel number.

Alabama

Alabama Public Television (APT PBS) – statewide simulcast on nine stations:
Birmingham – WBIQ 10
Demopolis – WIIQ 41
Dozier – WDIQ 2
Florence – WFIQ 36
Huntsville – WHIQ 25
Louisville – WGIQ 43
Mobile – WEIQ 42
Montgomery – WAIQ 26
Mount Cheaha – WCIQ 7

Alaska

Alaska Public Media – statewide simulcast on four stations:
Anchorage – KAKM 7
Bethel – KYUK-LD 15
Juneau – KTOO-DT 3
Fairbanks – KUAC-TV 9
Some PBS programs are also seen on the Alaska Rural Communications Service (ARCS), based in Anchorage.

Arizona

Phoenix – KAET 8 (Arizona PBS)
Tucson – KUAT-TV 6 (PBS 6)
Tucson – KUAS-TV 27 (satellite of KUAT-TV)

Arkansas

Arkansas PBS – statewide simulcast on six stations:
Arkadelphia – KETG 9
El Dorado – KETZ 12
Fayetteville – KAFT 13
Jonesboro – KTEJ 19
Little Rock – KETS 2
Mountain View – KEMV 6

California

Eureka – KEET 13 (PBS North Coast)
Fresno – KVPT 18 (Valley PBS)
Huntington Beach (Los Angeles) – KOCE-TV 50 (PBS SoCal)
Los Angeles – KCET 28
Los Angeles – KLCS 58
Redding (Chico) – KIXE-TV 9
Sacramento – KVIE 6
San Bernardino (Los Angeles) – KVCR-DT 24 (Empire KVCR)
San Diego – KPBS 15
San Francisco Bay Area
Cotati – KRCB 22 (Northern California Public Media)
San Francisco – KQED 9
Watsonville (Salinas-Monterey) – KQET 25 (satellite of KQED)
San Jose – KQEH 54 (KQED Plus)

Colorado

Broomfield (Denver) – KBDI-TV 12 (PBS 12)
Rocky Mountain PBS – statewide simulcast on five stations:
Denver – KRMA-TV 6 
Durango – KRMU 20
Grand Junction – KRMJ 18
Pueblo (Colorado Springs) – KTSC 8
Steamboat Springs – KRMZ 24

Connecticut

Connecticut Public Television (CPTV) – statewide simulcast on four stations:
Hartford – WEDH 24
New Haven – WEDY 65
Norwich – WEDN 53
Stamford – WEDW 49

Delaware

Wilmington, Delaware (Philadelphia, Pennsylvania) – WHYY-TV 12 
Seaford – WDPB 64 (satellite of WHYY-TV)

Washington, D.C.

 WETA-TV 26
 WHUT-TV 32 (ATSC 3.0 station) / WJLA-TV (ATSC 1.0 simulcast)

Florida

 Fort Myers (Naples) – WGCU 30
 Gainesville – WUFT 5
 Jacksonville – WJCT 7 (Jax PBS)
 Miami – WLRN-TV 17
 Orlando – WUCF-TV 24
 Pensacola – WSRE 23
 South Florida PBS – regional simulcast on two stations:
Boynton Beach – WXEL-TV 42
Miami – WPBT 2
 Tallahassee – WFSU-TV 11
 Panama City – WFSG 56 (satellite of WFSU-TV)
 Tampa – WEDU 3 / WEDQ 3.4

Georgia

Atlanta – WABE-TV 30 
Georgia Public Broadcasting (GPB) – statewide simulcast on nine stations:
Athens (Atlanta) – WGTV 8
Chatsworth – WNGH-TV 18
Cochran (Macon) – WMUM-TV 29
Columbus – WJSP-TV 28
Dawson – WACS-TV 25
Pelham (Albany) – WABW-TV 14
Savannah – WVAN-TV 9
Waycross – WXGA-TV 8
Wrens (Augusta) – WCES-TV 20

Hawaii

PBS Hawai'i – statewide simulcast on two stations:
Honolulu – KHET 11
Wailuku – KMEB 10

Idaho

Idaho Public Television – statewide simulcast on five stations:
Boise – KAID 4
Coeur d'Alene – KCDT 26
Moscow – KUID 12
Pocatello – KISU 10
Twin Falls – KIPT 13

Illinois

 Charleston – WEIU-TV 51
 Chicago – WTTW 11
 Moline (Quad Cities, Illinois/Iowa) – WQPT 24
 Peoria – WTVP 47
 Southern Illinois
 Carbondale – WSIU-TV 8
 Olney – WUSI-TV 16 (satellite of WSIU-TV)
 Jacksonville – WSEC 14
 Macomb – WMEC 22 (satellite of WSEC)
 Quincy – WQEC 27 (satellite of WSEC)
 Urbana – WILL-TV 12

Indiana

Bloomington – WTIU 30
Evansville – WNIN 9
Fort Wayne – WFWA 39 (PBS Fort Wayne)
Gary – WYIN 56 (Lakeshore PBS) 
Indianapolis – WFYI 20
Muncie – WIPB 49 (Ball State PBS)
South Bend – WNIT 34 (Michiana PBS)
Vincennes – WVUT 22 (Vincennes PBS)

Iowa

Iowa PBS – statewide simulcast on nine stations:
Council Bluffs (Omaha) – KBIN-TV 32
Davenport (Quad Cities, Illinois/Iowa) – KQIN 36
Des Moines – KDIN-TV 11
Fort Dodge – KTIN 21
Iowa City – KIIN 12
Mason City – KYIN 24
Red Oak – KHIN 36
Sioux City – KSIN-TV 27
Waterloo – KRIN 32

Kansas

Smoky Hills PBS – regional simulcast on four stations:
Colby – KWKS 19
Dodge City – KDCK 21
Hays – KOOD 9
Lakin – KSWK 3
Topeka – KTWU 11
Wichita – KPTS 8 (PBS Kansas)

Kentucky
Bowling Green  – WKYU-TV 24 (WKU PBS)
Kentucky Educational Television (KET) – statewide simulcast on 16 stations:
Ashland – WKAS 25
Bowling Green – WKGB-TV 53
Covington (Cincinnati, Ohio) – WCVN-TV 54
Elizabethtown – WKZT-TV 23
Hazard – WKHA 35
Lexington – WKLE 46
Louisville – WKPC-TV 15
Louisville – WKMJ-TV 68 (airs the PBS national schedule)
Madisonville – WKMA-TV 35
Morehead – WKMR 38
Murray – WKMU 21
Owensboro – WKOH 31
Owenton – WKON 52
Paducah – WKPD 29
Pikeville – WKPI-TV 22
Somerset – WKSO-TV 29

Louisiana

Louisiana Public Broadcasting (LPB) –  statewide simulcast on six stations:
Alexandria – KLPA-TV 25
Baton Rouge – WLPB-TV 27
Lafayette – KLPB-TV 24
Lake Charles – KLTL-TV 18
Monroe – KLTM-TV 13
Shreveport – KLTS-TV 24
New Orleans – WYES-TV 12

Maine

Maine Public Broadcasting Network (MPBN) – statewide simulcast on five stations:
Augusta – WCBB 10
Biddeford (Portland) – WMEA-TV 26
Calais – WMED-TV 13
Orono (Bangor) – WMEB-TV 12
Presque Isle – WMEM-TV 10

Maryland

Maryland Public Television (MPT) – statewide simulcast on six stations:
Annapolis – WMPT 22
Baltimore – WMPB 67
Frederick – WFPT 62
Hagerstown – WWPB 31
Oakland – WGPT 36
Salisbury – WCPB 28
An ATSC 3.0 simulcast of MPT is also seen via WNUV in Baltimore.

Massachusetts

Boston – WGBH-TV 2 / WGBX-TV 44 (GBH)
Springfield – WGBY-TV 57 (New England Public Media)

Michigan

Bad Axe (Flint-Saginaw-Bay City) – WDCQ-TV 19 (Delta College Public Media)
CMU Public Television – regional simulcast on four stations:
Alpena – WCML 6
Cadillac – WCMV 27 
Manistee – WCMW 21 
Mount Pleasant – WCMU-TV 14
Detroit – WTVS 56 (Detroit Public TV)
East Lansing – WKAR-TV 23
Marquette – WNMU 13 (Public TV 13)
WGVU Public Media – regional simulcast on two stations:
Grand Rapids – WGVU-TV 35
Kalamazoo – WGVK 52

Minnesota

Austin (Rochester) – KSMQ-TV 15
Crookston (East Grand Forks/Grand Forks) – KCGE-DT 16 (part of North Dakota-based Prairie Public Television)
Lakeland PBS – regional simulcast on two stations:
Bemidji – KAWE 9
Brainerd – KAWB 22
Pioneer PBS – regional simulcast on two stations:
Appleton – KWCM-TV 10
Worthington – KSMN 20
Saint Paul (Minneapolis) – KTCA-TV 2 / KTCI-TV 2.3 (Twin Cities PBS)
PBS North – regional simulcast on two stations:
Duluth – WDSE 8
Hibbing – WRPT 31

Mississippi

Mississippi Public Broadcasting (MPB) – statewide simulcast on eight stations:
Biloxi – WMAH-TV 19
Booneville – WMAE-TV 12
Bude – WMAU-TV 17
Greenwood – WMAO-TV 23
Jackson – WMPN-TV 29
Meridian – WMAW-TV 14
Mississippi State – WMAB-TV 2
Oxford – WMAV-TV 18

Missouri
Kansas City – KCPT 19 (Kansas City PBS)
 KMCI-TV (ATSC 3.0 simulcast of Kansas City PBS)
Ozarks Public Television – regional simulcast on two stations:
Joplin – KOZJ 26
Springfield – KOZK 21
St. Louis – KETC 9 (Nine PBS)
Sedalia (Columbia) – KMOS-TV 6

Montana
 Montana PBS – statewide simulcast on six stations:
Billings – KBGS-TV 16
Bozeman – KUSM 9
Great Falls – KUGF-TV 21
Helena – KUHM-TV 10
Kalispell – KUKL-TV 46
Missoula – KUFM-TV 11

Nebraska

Nebraska Public Media – statewide simulcast on nine stations:
Alliance – KTNE-TV 13
Bassett – KMNE-TV 7
Hastings – KHNE-TV 29
Lexington – KLNE-TV 3
Lincoln – KUON-TV 12
Merriman – KRNE-TV 12
Norfolk – KXNE-TV 19
North Platte – KPNE-TV 9
Omaha – KYNE-TV 26

Nevada

Las Vegas – KLVX 10 (Vegas PBS)
Reno – KNPB 5 (PBS Reno)

New Hampshire

New Hampshire PBS – statewide simulcast on three stations:
Durham – WENH-TV 11
Keene – WEKW-TV 11
Littleton – WLED-TV 11

New Jersey

 Newark (New York City) – WNET 13
 NJ PBS – statewide simulcast on four stations:
 Camden – WNJS 23
 Montclair – WNJN 50
 New Brunswick – WNJB 58
 Trenton – WNJT 52

New Mexico

Albuquerque – KNME-TV 5 (NM PBS)
Santa Fe – KNMD-TV 5 (NM PBS) (ATSC 3.0 station)
Las Cruces – KRWG-TV 22
Portales – KENW 3

New York

Binghamton – WSKG-TV 46
Corning (Elmira) – WSKA 30 (satellite of WSKG-TV)
Buffalo – WNED-TV 17 (Buffalo-Toronto Public Media)
Garden City (Long Island) – WLIW 21
Plattsburgh – WCFE-TV 57 (Mountain Lake PBS)
Rochester – WXXI-TV 21
Schenectady (Albany) – WMHT 17
 WCWN - (ATSC 3.0 simulcast)
Syracuse (Central New York) – WCNY-TV 24
Watertown – WPBS-TV 16
Norwood – WNPI-DT 18 (satellite of WPBS-TV)

North Carolina

Charlotte – WTVI 42 (PBS Charlotte)
PBS North Carolina (PBS NC) – statewide simulcast on 12 stations:
Asheville – WUNF-TV 33
Canton – WUNW 27
Chapel Hill (Raleigh-Durham) – WUNC-TV 4
 WNGT-CD (ATSC 3.0 simulcast)
Concord (Charlotte) – WUNG-TV 58
Edenton – WUND-TV 2
Greenville – WUNK-TV 25 (ATSC 3.0 station)
Jacksonville – WUNM-TV 19
Linville – WUNE-TV 17
Lumberton – WUNU 31
Roanoke Rapids – WUNP-TV 36
Wilmington – WUNJ-TV 39
Winston-Salem – WUNL-TV 26

North Dakota

Prairie Public Television – statewide simulcast on eight stations:
Bismarck – KBME-TV 3
Devils Lake – KMDE 25
Dickinson – KDSE 9
Ellendale – KJRE 19
Fargo – KFME 13
Grand Forks – KGFE 2
Minot – KSRE 6
Williston – KWSE 4

Ohio

Athens – WOUB-TV 20
Cambridge – WOUC-TV 44 (satellite of WOUB)
Bowling Green – WBGU-TV 27
Cincinnati – WCET 48
Cleveland – WVIZ 25 (ideastream Public Media)
Columbus – WOSU 34
PBS Western Reserve – regional simulcast on two stations:
Akron – WEAO 49
Youngstown – WNEO 45
Think TV – regional simulcast on two stations:
Dayton – WPTD 16 
Oxford – WPTO 14 
Toledo – WGTE-TV 30

Oklahoma

Oklahoma Educational Television Authority (OETA) – statewide simulcast on four stations:
Cheyenne – KWET 12
Eufaula – KOET 3
Oklahoma City – KETA-TV 13
Tulsa – KOED-TV 11

Oregon

Oregon Public Broadcasting (OPB) – statewide simulcast on five stations:
Bend – KOAB-TV 3
Corvallis – KOAC-TV 7
Eugene – KEPB-TV 28
La Grande – KTVR 13
Portland – KOPB-TV 10
 KPDX - (ATSC 3.0 simulcast)
Southern Oregon PBS – regional simulcast on two stations:
Klamath Falls – KFTS 22
Medford – KSYS 8

Pennsylvania

Allentown – WLVT-TV 39 (PBS39)
Clearfield (Altoona-Johnstown) – WPSU-TV 3
Erie – WQLN 54
Harrisburg – WITF-TV 33
Philadelphia – WPPT 35 (PBS39 Extra)
Pittsburgh – WQED 13
Scranton – WVIA-TV 44 (VIA TV)

Rhode Island

Providence: WSBE-TV 36 (Rhode Island PBS)

South Carolina

South Carolina Educational Television (SCETV) – statewide simulcast on 11 stations:
Allendale (Augusta, Georgia) – WEBA-TV 14
Beaufort – WJWJ-TV 16
Charleston – WITV 7
Columbia – WRLK-TV 35
Conway – WHMC-TV 23
Florence – WJPM-TV 33
Greenville – WNTV 29
Greenwood – WNEH 38
Rock Hill (Charlotte, North Carolina) – WNSC-TV 30
Spartanburg – WRET-TV 49
Sumter – WRJA-TV 27

South Dakota

South Dakota Public Broadcasting (SDPB) – statewide simulcast on nine stations:
Aberdeen – KDSD-TV 16
Brookings – KESD-TV 8
Eagle Butte – KPSD-TV 13
Lowry – KQSD-TV 11
Martin – KZSD-TV 8
Pierre – KTSD-TV 10
Rapid City – KBHE-TV 9
Sioux Falls – KCSD-TV 23
Vermillion – KUSD-TV 2

Tennessee

Chattanooga – WTCI 45
Cookeville – WCTE 22
East Tennessee PBS – regional simulcast on two stations:
Knoxville – WKOP-TV 15
Sneedville (Tri-Cities, Tennessee/Virginia) – WETP-TV 2
Lexington – WLJT-DT 11
Memphis – WKNO 10
Nashville – WNPT 8 (Nashville Public Television)

Texas

Amarillo – KACV-TV 2 (Panhandle PBS)
Austin – KLRU 18 (Austin PBS)
College Station (Waco) – KAMU-TV 12
Corpus Christi – KEDT 16
Dallas (Fort Worth) – KERA-TV 13
El Paso – KCOS 13 (PBS El Paso)
Houston – KUHT 8 (Houston Public Media)
La Feria (Rio Grande Valley) – KCWT-CD 21.4 (airs the PBS national schedule)
Lubbock – KTTZ-TV 5 (PBS Texas Tech Public Media)
Midland–Odessa – KPBT-TV 36 (Basin PBS)
San Antonio – KLRN 9

Utah

 PBS Utah – statewide simulcast on three stations:
Richfield – KUES 19
Salt Lake City – KUED 7
St. George – KUEW 18

Vermont

Vermont Public – statewide simulcast on four stations:
Burlington – WETK 33
Rutland – WVER 28
St. Johnsbury – WVTB 20
Windsor – WVTA 41

Virginia

Norfolk – WHRO-TV 15
Roanoke – WBRA-TV 15 (Blue Ridge PBS)
Virginia Public Media – regional simulcast on five stations:
Richmond – WCVE-TV 23
Charlottesville – WHTJ 41 (satellite of WCVE-TV)
Staunton (Harrisonburg) – WVPT 51.1 (satellite of WCVE-TV)
Richmond – WCVW 57 (VPM Plus; ATSC 3.0 station)
New Market – WVPY 51.2 (satellite of WCVW)

Washington

 Northwest Public Television 
Pullman – KWSU-TV 10
Richland – KTNW 31 
Seattle – KCTS-TV 9
Yakima – KYVE 47 (satellite of KCTS)
Spokane – KSPS-TV 7
Tacoma – KBTC-TV 28 
Centralia – KCKA 15 (satellite of KBTC)

West Virginia

West Virginia Public Broadcasting – statewide simulcast on three stations:
Grandview (Bluefield-Beckley) – WSWP-TV 9
Huntington – WVPB-TV 33
Morgantown – WNPB-TV 24

Wisconsin

Milwaukee – WMVS 10 / WMVT 36 (Milwaukee PBS)
PBS Wisconsin – statewide simulcast on six stations
Green Bay (Appleton/Northeast Wisconsin) – WPNE-TV 38
La Crosse – WHLA-TV 31
Madison – WHA-TV 21
Menomonie (Eau Claire) – WHWC-TV 28
Park Falls – WLEF-TV 36
Wausau – WHRM-TV 20

Wyoming

Wyoming PBS – statewide simulcast on three stations:
Casper – KPTW 6
Lander (Riverton) – KCWC-DT 4
Laramie (Cheyenne) – KWYP-DT 8

U.S. territories

American Samoa

Pago Pago, American Samoa: KVZK-TV 7

Guam/Northern Mariana Islands

Hagåtña: KGTF 12 (PBS Guam)

Puerto Rico

San Juan - WIPR-TV 6
Mayaguez - WIPM-TV 3 (satellite of WIPR-TV)
Fajardo – WMTJ 40 (Sistema TV)
Ponce – WQTO 26 (satellite of WMTJ)

U.S. Virgin Islands

St. Thomas: WTJX-TV 12

Former member stations

PBS
Provo, Utah: KBYU-TV 11 (October 5, 1970 – July 2, 2018; now runs BYUtv in full)
San Mateo, California: KCSM-TV 60 (now KPJK 60) (October 5, 1970 – July 14, 2009; now non-commercial independent)
Waco, Texas: KDYW 34 (October 5, 1970 – July 1, 2010; now defunct)
Waco, Texas: KNCT 46 (commercial license; October 5, 1970 – August 31, 2018; Silent network from August 31, 2018 – January 1, 2019; now a CW affiliate since January 2, 2019)
Denton, Texas: KDTN 2 (September 1, 1988 – January 13, 2004; now flagship station for Daystar)
San Francisco, California: KQEC 32 (now KMTP-TV 32) (October 5, 1970 – May 11, 1988; independent)
Oklahoma City, Oklahoma: KTLC 43 (now KAUT-TV 43) (April 23, 1991 – January 18, 1998; commercial license; became an affiliate of UPN, and MyNetworkTV in 2006, currently independent since 2012)
Tacoma, Washington: KCPQ 13 (January 4, 1976 – February 29, 1980; commercial license; has been a Fox affiliate since 1986, owned directly by the network since 2020)
Washington, District of Columbia: W14AA 22 (now WMDO-CD 22) (December 27, 1976 – June 6, 1981; commercial license; became an affiliate of SIN, and UniMás in 2001)
Flint, Michigan: WCMZ-TV 28 (August 23, 1980 – April 23, 2018; defunct)
Daytona Beach, Florida: WDSC-TV 15 (independent since 2011)
Cocoa, Florida: WEFS 68 (now WBCC 68) (independent since 2012)
Tampa, Florida: WUSF-TV 16 (defunct as of 2017)
New Orleans, Louisiana: WLAE-TV 32 (owned by the Archdiocese of New Orleans; independent since 2013)
Schenectady, New York: WMHX/WMHQ 45 (now WCWN 45) (commercial license; became an affiliate of The WB in 1999, and The CW in 2006)
Culpeper, Virginia: WNVC 41 (currently a World Channel member station since 2020)
Spotsylvania Courthouse, Virginia: WNVT 23 (currently a World Channel member station since 2020)
Buffalo, New York: WNEQ-TV 23 (now WLNO 23) (commercial license transferred from WNED-TV to sell station; became an affiliate of UPN in 2003, and The CW in 2006)
New York, New York: WNYC-TV 31 (now WPXN-TV 31) (commercial license formerly municipally-owned; currently an O&O Ion Television station since 1998)
New York, New York: WNYE-TV 25 (October 5, 1970 – December 2004; non-commercial independent since 2004)
Pittsburgh, Pennsylvania: WQEX 16 (now WINP 16) (commercial license; currently an O&O Ion Television affiliate since 2011)
Chicago, Illinois: WYCC 20 (February 17, 1983 – November 27, 2017; now defunct as of 2022)
Harlingen, Texas: KMBH 38 (now KFXV 38) (May 5, 1982 – July 13, 1983; October 8, 1985 – 2016; commercial license; currently a Fox affiliate since 2020)
Portsmouth, Ohio: WPBO-TV 42 (former satellite of WOSU-TV, defunct)
Newark, Ohio: WGSF (defunct)
St. John, Indiana: WCAE 50 (defunct, license still active as WYIN)
Ogden, Utah: KOET (defunct) and KWCS-TV (defunct)
Logan, Utah: KUSU-TV (defunct)
Provo, Utah: KLOR-TV (defunct)
Seattle, Washington: KPEC-TV (defunct)
Salem, Oregon: KVDO-TV
Hanover, New Hampshire: WHED-TV 
Berlin, New Hampshire: WEDB-TV
High Knob, Virginia: WSBN-TV
Walker Mountain, Virginia: WMSY-TV

References 

PBS